Postenan is a community in the Korçë County, southern Albania. At the 2015 local government reform it became part of the municipality Kolonjë.

Notable people
Athanas Sina, writer and activist of the Albanian National Awakening.
Jani Vreto, writer and activist of the Albanian National Awakening.
 Vasil Ndreko, member of the Society for the Publication of Albanian Writings

References

Populated places in Kolonjë, Korçë
Villages in Korçë County